is a park in Masuda, Shimane Prefecture, Japan. The park takes its name from the Man'yōshū, drawing on the historic connections between Kakinomoto no Hitomaro and Iwami Province, and includes within it a botanical garden with 153 of the species of plant that are named in the anthology.

See also
 Manyo Botanical Garden, Nara
 Futagami Manyo Botanical Gardens

External links
 Shimane Prefectural Manyo Park

References

Parks and gardens in Shimane Prefecture
Masuda, Shimane
Man'yōshū
1982 establishments in Japan
Parks established in 1982
Botanical gardens in Japan